Cicindela aberrans is a species of tiger beetle in the genus Cicindela.

References

aberrans
Beetles described in 1871